Eduard Arturovich Bagrintsev (born 13 January 2003) is an Armenian football player. Born in Sochi, Russia, he formerly represented Russian national youth teams. He plays for Slovak club Dubnica.

Club career
He made his debut for the main team of PFC CSKA Moscow on 23 September 2021 in a Russian Cup game against FC Zenit-Izhevsk.

On 1 September 2022, Bagrintsev moved to Dubnica in Slovakia, CSKA retained a buy-back option.

International career
Bagrintsev was born in Russia  and represented Russia on junior levels. His father is Armenian and his mother half-Armenian. In April 2022, Bagrintsev announced that he switched his allegiance to Armenia and will represent the country as soon as he formally acquires the citizenship.

Career statistics

References

External links
 
 
 

2003 births
Sportspeople from Sochi
Russian sportspeople of Armenian descent
Living people
Russian footballers
Russia youth international footballers
Armenian footballers
Association football forwards
PFC CSKA Moscow players
FK Dubnica players
Russian expatriate footballers
Expatriate footballers in Slovakia
Russian expatriate sportspeople in Slovakia
Armenian expatriate footballers
Armenian expatriate sportspeople in Slovakia